CFCA may refer to:

 Chicago Film Critics Association, an American film critic association.
 Christian Foundation for Children and Aging, a charity organization now known as Unbound
 European Fisheries Control Agency, previously known as the Community Fisheries Control Agency, an agency of the European Union (EU) based in Vigo, Spain. 
 CFCA-FM, branded as 105.3 Kool FM, is a Canadian radio station.
 CFCA (AM), was a radio station operated by the Toronto Daily Star from 1922 to 1933.

es:CFCA
pt:CFCA